Šibenik is a city in Dalmatia, Croatia.

Šibenik may also refer to:

 Šibenik, Šentjur, a village in Slovenia
 Šibenik (mountain), a mountain in Croatia
 HNK Šibenik, the Croatian football club from the city of Šibenik
 , a Croatian Končar-class missile boat.

Sibenik may also refer to:

 Sibenik, Bjelovar-Bilogora County, a village in Croatia